Anuragathinte Dinangal (The Days of Intimacy) is a book by Vaikom Muhammad Basheer published in 1983. The author himself has traced Anuragathinte Dinangal to the diary he had kept of a Hindu girl's love for him frustrated by the objection from her parents and Basheer's refusal to hurt them. The book was originally titled Kaamukante Diary (The Diary of the Paramour) but was changed later on the suggestion of author M. T. Vasudevan Nair.

References

Books by Vaikom Muhammad Basheer
Diaries
Literary memoirs
1983 non-fiction books
Indian autobiographies
Malayalam-language books